The Quarry brothers were three sibling American boxers of the 20th century:

 Jerry Quarry (1945–1999), American heavyweight boxer
 Mike Quarry (1951–2006), light heavyweight boxer
 Bobby Quarry (born 1962), youngest brother of Jerry and Mike Quarry